Du Barry Did Alright (1937) is a Black and White Warner Brothers Vitaphone musical short starring Irène Bordoni.

Plot 
A woman living in Paris (Bordoni) feels neglected by her husband (Dingle), so she leaves for New York.

Cast 
 Irène Bordoni as Irene Wainwright 
 Charles Dingle as John Wainwright  
 Regina Wallace as Edna 
 Eddie Noll as himself 
 Marion Nolan as herself 
 Joey Ray as Orchestra leader  
 Charles Carrer as himself 
 Harland Dixan as Dancer 
 Percy Helton as Hotel Desk Clerk (uncredited)

Songs 
 Forty Second Street (studio orchestra)  
  Darktown Strutters' Ball (dance number) 
 When the Cat's Away Performed by Joey Ray   
 Du Barry Didn't  Do So Bad Performed by Irene Bordoni

See also 
 Broadway's Like That (1930) short film   
 Paree, Paree (1934) short film   
 Sound-on-disc

1937 films
Vitaphone short films
Warner Bros. short films
American musical films
1937 musical films
American black-and-white films
1930s American films
1930s English-language films